Periodic comets (also known as short-period comets) are comets with orbital periods of less than 200 years or that have been observed during more than a single perihelion passage (e.g. 153P/Ikeya–Zhang). "Periodic comet" is also sometimes used to mean any comet with a periodic orbit, even if greater than 200 years.

Periodic comets receive a permanent number prefix usually after the second perihelion passage, which is why there are a number of unnumbered periodic comets, such as P/2005 T5 (Broughton). Comets that are not observed after a number of perihelion passages, or presumed to be destroyed, are given the D designation, and likewise comets given a periodic number and subsequently lost are given [n]D instead of [n]P, such as 3D/Biela or 5D/Brorsen.

In nearly all cases, comets are named after their discoverers, but in a few cases such as 2P/Encke and 27P/Crommelin they were named for a person who calculated their orbits (the orbit computers). The long-term orbits of comets are difficult to calculate because of errors in the known trajectory that accumulate with perturbations from the planets, and in the days before electronic computers some people dedicated their entire careers to this. Even so, quite a few comets were lost because their orbits are also affected by non-gravitational effects such as the release of gas and other material that forms the comet's coma and tail. Unlike a long-period comet, the next perihelion passage of a numbered periodic comet can be predicted with a high degree of accuracy.

Periodic comets sometimes bear the same name repeatedly (e.g. the nine Shoemaker–Levy comets or the twenty-four NEAT comets); the IAU system distinguishes between them either through the number prefix  or by the full designation (e. g. 181P and 192P/Shoemaker–Levy are both "Comet Shoemaker–Levy"). In the literature, an informal numbering system is applied to periodic comets (skipping the non-periodic ones), thus 181P and 192P are known as Comet Shoemaker–Levy 6 and Comet Shoemaker–Levy 1, respectively. Non-periodic Shoemaker–Levy comets are interleaved in this sequence: C/1991 B1 between 2 and 3, C/1991 T2 between 5 and 6, C/1993 K1 and C/1994 E2 after Shoemaker–Levy 9.

In comet nomenclature, the letter before the "/" is either "C" (a non-periodic comet), "P" (a periodic comet), "D" (a comet that has been lost or has disintegrated), "X" (a comet for which no reliable orbit could be calculated —usually historical comets), "I" for an interstellar object, or "A" for an object that was either mistakenly identified as a comet, but is actually a minor planet, or for an object on a hyperbolic orbit that does not show cometary activity. Some lists retain the "C" prefix for comets of periods larger than about 30 years until their return is confirmed.

List of Halley-type comets

List of unnumbered Jupiter-Family comets
While Jupiter-family comets are officially defined by 2 < TJupiter < 3, they can also be loosely defined as any comet with a period of less than 20 years, a relatively low inclination, and an orbit coinciding loosely with that of Jupiter. These comets are often patchily observed, as orbital interactions with the planet often cause comets' orbits to become perturbed, causing them to not be found at the expected position in the sky and subsequently lost. Additionally, their low cometary albedos and frequent proximity to the Sun compared to Oort Cloud comets cause them to much more quickly become depleted of volatiles, making them comparatively dimmer than comets with longer orbital periods.

See also
 List of comets by type
 List of numbered comets
 List of near-parabolic comets

References

External links 
 Minor Planet Center Periodic Comet Numbers
 Cometography.com Periodic Comets
 Seiichi Yoshida's Comet Catalog
 MPC: Dates of Last Observation of Comets (periodic and non-periodic)

Periodic comets

de:Liste der Kometen#Periodische Kometen
lb:Koméitelëschten#Periodesch Koméiten